Eduard Müller (12 November 1848 – 9 November 1919) was a Swiss politician, Mayor of Bern (1888–1895), President of the Swiss National Council (1890/1891) and member of the Swiss Federal Council (1895–1919). He was a member of the Free Democratic Party.

Member of the Federal Council

Müller was elected to the Federal Council of Switzerland on August 16, 1895. 

While he was in office, he held the following departments:
Department of Justice and Police (1895–1897)
Military Department (1897–1898)
Political Department (1899) as President of the Confederation
Military Department (1900–1906)
Political Department (1907) as President of the Confederation
Military Department (1908–1911)
Department of Justice and Police (1912)
Political Department (1913) as President of the Confederation
Department of Justice and Police (1914–1919)

Electoral Information
Müller was elected to the federal council on 1 ballot with 136 votes.
 Ballots distributed: 171
 Ballots received: 170
 Blank ballots: 6
 Spoiled ballots: 0
 Valid ballots: 164
 Absolute majority: 83

He died in office on 9 November 1919 at the age of 70.

External links

1848 births
1919 deaths
Politicians from Dresden
People from the Kingdom of Saxony
Free Democratic Party of Switzerland politicians
Foreign ministers of Switzerland
Members of the National Council (Switzerland)
Presidents of the National Council (Switzerland)
Members of the Federal Council (Switzerland)
Mayors of Bern
19th-century Swiss politicians
20th-century Swiss politicians